Pavol Červenák and Matteo Viola were the defending champions, but decided not to compete.

Máximo González and Andrés Molteni won the title, defeating Guillermo Durán and Renzo Olivo in the final, 7–5, 6–4.

Seeds

Draw

Draw

References
 Main Draw

Campeonato Internacional de Tenis de Santos - Doubles
2014 Doubles